Gladstone ministry may refer to:

 First Gladstone ministry, the British majority government led by William Gladstone from 1868 to 1874
 Second Gladstone ministry, the British majority government led by Gladstone from 1880 to 1885
 Third Gladstone ministry, the British minority government led by Gladstone from February to July 1886
 Fourth Gladstone ministry, the British minority government led by Gladstone from 1892 to 1894

See also
Premierships of William Ewart Gladstone